Fabregat is a surname. Notable people with the surname include:

Àngel Fabregat (born 1965), Spanish writer
Federico Fabregat (1975-2021), Mexican artist and poet
Jordi Fabregat (born 1961), Spanish footballer
José Joaquín Fabregat (1748–1807), Mexican engraver and cartoonist

See also
Fabregas